9 Dead Gay Guys is a 2002 British comedy film directed by Lab Ky Mo and starring Brendan Mackey and Glen Mulhern and released by TLA Releasing.

Plot

"Have you heard? The Queen's dead!" an older man in the pub tells Byron (Mackey). And the adventure to find the hordes of cash in Golders Green's mattress—the bread in the bed—begins!

Byron is a self-described lazy bastard, who came to London from Belfast in search of gainful employment, which he has found in the form of performing sexual favours on older gay men to supplement his giro. On this occasion, he is joined by his hometown friend Kenny (Mulhern), newly arrived to the Big Smoke after receiving a letter from Byron that doesn't tell the whole story of what he does for a living.  This is Kenny's first visit to a gay pub but it's not his last.  In fact, Kenny turns out to be better at this gainful employment lark than Byron; except that Kenny is so talented, he accidentally shags men to death.

Meanwhile, Byron's work leads him to an encounter with The Desperate Dwarf (Griffiths) with a three-and-a-half-inch willie, from whom he liberates the very cattle prod used to kill The Queen (Praed), who, it transpires, became the lover of Golders Green (Godley) because he passed Golders Green's really hard, really long Red Bull test.  The Queen was killed on a Friday evening while Golders Green, an otherwise Orthodox Jew, was at Sabbath Services.

The plot thickens and the dead gay guy count rises, as more people begin to look for the bread in the bed, not least including The Iron Lady (Sharman) and several accomplices, who manage to find the bed but there is no money in it.  Then, Kenny remembers ...

Cast
Glen Mulhern as Kenny
Brendan Mackey as Byron
Steven Berkoff as Jeff
Michael Praed as The Queen
Vas Blackwood as Donkey-Dick Dark
Fish as Old Nick
Leon Herbert as Nev
Simon Godley as Golders Green
Carol Decker as Jeff's Wife
Raymond Griffiths as The Desperate Dwarf
Abdala Keserwani as Dick-Cheese Deepak
Karen Sharman as The Iron Lady
Carl Merchant as The Waiter

Reception
The film was first shown at the Cannes Film Festival in 2002. It created such a storm that the film quickly sold out and people had to be turned away at the box office, so the film was given extra viewings to accommodate the demand. During screenings people's reaction to the film was extreme: either they loved it or walked out in disgust. Critical reception of 9 Dead Gay Guys was very negative, earning a Rotten Tomatoes score of 18 out of 100, based upon 22 aggregate reviews.  However Dave Kehr wrote for The New York Times that "the film strains mightily to be flashy and hip but finishes more in the realm of the merely distasteful," though Andy Klein of Variety stated "9 Dead Gay Guys, a dark comedy in the John Waters tradition, takes place in such a cartoonish, good-natured universe it's hard to imagine anyone taking offence."

Due to the film's seemingly controversial subject matter the film could only secure a limited release, and subsequently made only $26,377 at the box office. In the film's initial sole theater, the film grossed $3,462 in the opening week.

The film won two major awards. The first was the 2002 'Audience Award' for 'Best Feature Film at the Dublin Gay and Lesbian film festival. The second award was the 'Festival Prize' at the Montreal 'Just For Laughs' comedy film festival.

References

External links
 
 
 

2002 films
British comedy films
British LGBT-related films
2002 comedy films
LGBT-related comedy films
2002 LGBT-related films
Gay-related films
2000s English-language films
2000s British films